Kathleen Vereecken (born 14 December 1962) is a Belgian writer of novels, children's literature and non-fiction.

She has won several awards for her work, including the Boekenleeuw (2010 and 2019) and Woutertje Pieterse Prijs (2019).

Early life 

Vereecken was born in 1962 as one of four daughters. She worked as a journalist for various women's magazines as well as the newspaper De Standaard.

Career 

Vereecken published her first book Het raadsel in het fluisterbos in 1993, a story that she submitted to a children's literature competition. Both her books Alle kleuren grijs (1997) and Kleine Cecilia (1999) were nominated for the Gouden Uil award. Many of her books have a historic theme such as Lara & Rebecca (2006), which takes places on a nineteenth century plantation in Louisiana, and Ik denk dat het liefde was (2009) and  Zijdeman (2013) which both take place in 18th century Paris. Vereecken has also written various non-fiction books, such as Het broeikaseffect (2007) about global warming and Obama - De weg naar verandering (2009) about the life of Barack Obama.

In 2010, she won the Boekenleeuw for her book Ik denk dat het liefde was. She also won the Kleine Cervantes, the children's literature award of the city of Ghent, for this book in 2011.

In 2019, she won both the Woutertje Pieterse Prijs and the Boekenleeuw together with illustrator Charlotte Peys for their book Alles komt goed, altijd, a story about a girl during World War I.

Vereecken's books have been illustrated by various illustrators, including Anne Westerduin and Piet De Moor.

Awards 

 2010: Boekenleeuw, Ik denk dat het liefde was
 2011: Kleine Cervantes, Ik denk dat het liefde was
 2019: Woutertje Pieterse Prijs, Alles komt goed, altijd (with Charlotte Peys)
 2019: Boekenleeuw, Alles komt goed, altijd (with Charlotte Peys)

Publications 

 1993: Het raadsel in het fluisterbos
 1994: Gewoon vrienden
 1995: Morgen word ik heks
 1997: Alle kleuren grijs
 1999: Kleine Cecilia
 2001: Wreed schoon
 2002: Kunnen heksen heksen?
 2006: Lara & Rebecca
 2006: Kippenvel op je huid en vlinders in je buik
 2007: Het broeikaseffect
 2008: Minnaressen
 2009: Obama - De weg naar verandering
 2009: Ik denk dat het liefde was
 2011: Schaduwmoeder - Je kind afstaan voor adoptie
 2013: Zijdeman
 2014: Ik heet Jan en ik ben niets bijzonders (with Eva Mouton)
 2016: Haar
 2018: Alles komt goed, altijd

References

External links 
 
 Kathleen Vereecken (in Dutch), Digital Library for Dutch Literature
 Kathleen Vereecken, flandersliterature.be
 Kathleen Vereecken (in Dutch), jeugdliteratuur.org

1962 births
Living people
Flemish women writers
Belgian children's writers
Belgian women children's writers
20th-century Belgian women writers
21st-century Belgian women writers
Woutertje Pieterse Prize winners
Boekenleeuw winners